Sargus flavipes, the yellow-legged centurion, is a European species of soldier fly.

Description
Body length: 7–9 mm. Yellow legs. Males have a green abdomen and thorax; females have a black abdomen with purple reflections.

Biology
The habitat is meadowland and woodland. The adult flies from May to October.
Larvae have been found in cow dung and compost.

Distribution
Europe including European Russia.

References

External links
Ecology of Commanster

Stratiomyidae
Diptera of Europe
Insects described in 1822